Thangwang Wangham is an Indian politician from the state of Arunachal Pradesh.

Wangham was elected  from Longding-Pumao seat in the 2014 Arunachal Pradesh Legislative Assembly election, standing as a People's Party of Arunachal candidate. In terms of educational qualification, he is a graduate (B.A.).

See also
Arunachal Pradesh Legislative Assembly

References

External links
Thangwang Wangham profile
MyNeta Profile
Janpratinidhi Profile

Indian National Congress politicians
Living people
People's Party of Arunachal politicians
Arunachal Pradesh MLAs 2014–2019
Year of birth missing (living people)
National People's Party (India) politicians